Chapin is an unincorporated community and census-designated place in northern Franklin County, Iowa, United States. It lies along local roads just off U.S. Route 65, north of the city of Hampton, the county seat of Franklin County. Its elevation is 1,155 feet (352 m), and it is located at  (42.8335814, -93.2221464). Although Chapin is unincorporated, it has a post office with the ZIP code of 50427, which opened on 29 February 1860. As of the 2010 census, its population was 87.

Chapin was platted in 1858 by Josiah Bushnell Grinnell, who had previously founded Grinnell, Iowa. He gave this new town the name Chapin, the maiden name of his wife.

Demographics

Education
Chapin is part of the West Fork Community School District, formed in 2011 by the merger of the Sheffield–Chapin–Meservey–Thornton (SCMT) Community School District and the Rockwell–Swaledale Community School District. SCMT was formed in 2007 by the merger of the Sheffield–Chapin Community School District and the Meservey–Thornton Community School District. Sheffield–Chapin, in turn, formed in 1960 from the merger of the Sheffield Community School District and the Chapin Community School District.

References

Census-designated places in Franklin County, Iowa
Census-designated places in Iowa
1858 establishments in Iowa
Populated places established in 1858